Elections to Gateshead Council in Tyne and Wear, England were held on 2 May 2002. One third of the council was up for election and the Labour Party kept overall control of the council.

The election took place with all postal voting in an attempt to increase voter turnout. This followed a successful trial in two wards in the previous election in 2000. As a result of the trial turnout rose from 30% to 57.4%, which was higher than Gateshead saw in the 2001 general election.

Only one seat changed hands in the election, with the Liberal Democrats making one gain from Labour.

After the election, the composition of the council was:
Labour 46
Liberal Democrat 19
Liberal 1

Election result

Ward results

References

2002 English local elections
2002
21st century in Tyne and Wear